Mario "Bebe" Cota Castro (born 11 September 1990 in Mexicali) is a Mexican track and field athlete specialising in the shot put and discus throw. He won multiple medals on continental level.

Personal bests
He has personal bests of 19.30 metres in the shot put (Xalapa 2014) and 63.35 metres in the discus (Chula Vista 2016). The latter is the current national record.

Competition record

References

External links

1990 births
Living people
Sportspeople from Mexicali
Mexican male shot putters
Mexican male discus throwers
Pan American Games competitors for Mexico
Athletes (track and field) at the 2011 Pan American Games
Athletes (track and field) at the 2015 Pan American Games
Central American and Caribbean Games gold medalists for Mexico
Competitors at the 2010 Central American and Caribbean Games
Competitors at the 2014 Central American and Caribbean Games
Competitors at the 2018 Central American and Caribbean Games
Autonomous University of Nuevo León alumni
Competitors at the 2011 Summer Universiade
Competitors at the 2017 Summer Universiade
Central American and Caribbean Games medalists in athletics
21st-century Mexican people